Kurumi Ota (born 3 July 1987) is a Japanese woman cricketer. She was a member of the Japanese cricket team which won the bronze medal at the 2010 Asian Games. She also competed at the 2014 Asian Games representing the national team.

Kurumi was also the part of the national team at the 2013 Women's World Twenty20 Qualifier.

References

External links 

Profile at CricHQ

1987 births
Living people
Japanese women cricketers
Cricketers at the 2010 Asian Games
Cricketers at the 2014 Asian Games
Asian Games medalists in cricket
Asian Games bronze medalists for Japan
Sportspeople from Tokyo
Medalists at the 2010 Asian Games